Possessor is the third studio album by American heavy metal band Rusty Eye. The album was released on June 6, 2009, through the band’s own Epoché Records. It was recorded at Raymond Herrera and B-Real's Temple Studios in Chatsworth, California. It was mixed by Jeremy Blair, and included collaborations by horror film composer Claudio Simonetti on "Mondo Cane" and "Wings of a Demon"; producer and guitarist/keyboardist Waldemar Sorychta on "Somnambulist Possession" and "Mandragora Screams"; and vocalist Alex Mitchell on "The Serial Kind". The album's cover was illustrated by artist Joe Petagno.

Release
It has been released on three formats, including a limited edition vinyl CD (limited to 1000), a white CD in a black jacket and a red cassette tape (limited to 100).

References

2009 albums
Rusty Eye albums